Annemarie Gödri-Părău (born March 8, 1984) is a Romanian professional female basketball player. She is Nigerian descent through her father. As a member of the senior Romanian national basketball team, Gödri-Părău competed at the 2005 EuroBasket, also at the 2007 EuroBasket.

References

External links
 Profile at Eurobasket.com
Profile at Fiba Europe

1984 births
Living people
Club Sportiv Municipal Târgoviște players
Point guards
Sportspeople from Timișoara
Romanian people of Nigerian descent
Romanian women's basketball players
Shooting guards